Spring Lake, an oval-shaped lake, has a surface area of . Spring Lake  is in a highly urbanized area. On the north shore is a retail area, US Highway 17 is on its east side. Apartment buildings are on the south side of the lake.

There is no public access to the shores of this lake, since it is completely surrounded by private property. However, boats may reach Spring Lake from a canal connecting it to Lake Mirror. This lake is part of the south system of the Winter Haven Chain of Lakes, so it may be reached by boats coming from a number of public boat ramps in the system.  The Hook and Bullet website says this lake contains rainbow trout.

References

Lakes of Polk County, Florida